Pandyanda I. Belliappa (or Pandianda I. Belliappa) was a Gandhian, a freedom fighter and politician from the erstwhile state of Coorg.

Freedom struggle
Belliappa entered politics in 1921 as a member of the Coorg Planters' Association. He later joined the Congress Party and became one of its prominent members. A staunch Gandhian, satyagrahi and freedom fighter he courted arrest during the freedom struggle. 
His wife Pandyanda Seethamma Belliappa was also a freedom fighter who courted arrest. He was also the editor of a periodical called the 'Kodagu'. At his invitation, Mahatma Gandhi, his secretary Mr. Thakkar, the President of the Dalit Sangha, a German journalist, Miss Jamnalal Bajaj and others came to Gonikoppal in Coorg.

Coorg state
In 1952, he separated from the Congress along with others and fought the Coorg state elections as independents while floating a new party called the Takkadi ('justice scales') party. The issue they fought against was the proposed merger of Coorg with Mysore. They lost the elections to the Congress, led by C M Poonacha, but won nine of the Assembly seats. The Takkadi party was a dominant political force and voice in Coorg with its anti-merger plank.

References

Indian independence activists from Karnataka
Kodava people
People from Kodagu district
Gandhians
Indian National Congress politicians from Karnataka
Coorg State politicians
Coorg State MLAs 1952–1956